The Gobi is the largest desert region in Asia.

Gobi may also refer to:
 GOBI, a selective primary child health care approach
 Gobi bear, a subspecies of the brown bear
 Gobi (fish), the type species for the genus Platycephalus
 GGobi, a statistical software tool used for graphing various types of data
 Gobichettipalayam, a town in Tamil Nadu, India
 Osmunda japonica, Asian royal fern
 Qualcomm Gobi, a mobile broadband technology
 Gobi (dog), a small stray dog found in the Gobi Desert by marathon runner Dion Leonard, and later adopted by him
 The Gobi Desert (novel), a 1941 novel by Pierre Benoit
 Gobi Avedian, Malaysian drug offender jailed in Singapore

See also
 Aloo gobi, Indian dish of potatoes and cauliflower
 Goby (disambiguation)